Grant Calcaterra (born December 4, 1998) is an American football tight end for the Philadelphia Eagles of the National Football League (NFL). He played college football at Oklahoma before transferring to SMU.

High school career
Calcaterra attended Santa Margarita Catholic High School in Rancho Santa Margarita, California. As a junior, he caught 48 passes for 926 yards and nine touchdowns. He committed to play college football at the University of Oklahoma after his junior season. As a senior, he caught 57 passes for 958 yards and eight touchdowns. He was named to the 2017 Under Armour All-America Game.

College career
As a freshman at Oklahoma in 2017, Calcaterra played in 14 games and caught ten passes for 162 yards and three touchdowns. In 2018, his sophomore year, he appeared in 14 games and registered 26 catches for 396 yards and six touchdowns. He missed a majority of the 2019 season due to a concussion.

Following the 2019 season, Calcaterra announced he would be retiring from football due to suffering multiple concussions throughout his playing career. He did not play a game in 2020, but announced in November that he would return to football and play at Auburn University. In January 2021, he announced he would not be enrolling at Auburn. He announced later that month he would be enrolling at Southern Methodist University. For the 2021 season, he appeared in 11 games and caught 38 passes for 465 yards and four touchdowns.

College statistics

Professional career

Calcaterra was selected by the Philadelphia Eagles in the sixth round with the 198th overall pick of the 2022 NFL Draft. He then signed a $3.8 million contract with the Eagles which included a $174,142 signing bonus.

References

External links
 Philadelphia Eagles bio
 Oklahoma Sooners bio
SMU Mustangs bio

Living people
Players of American football from California
American football tight ends
Oklahoma Sooners football players
People from Rancho Santa Margarita, California
SMU Mustangs football players
Sportspeople from Orange County, California
1998 births
Philadelphia Eagles players